Tommy Rooney (born 30 December 1984) is an English footballer who played for League Two club Macclesfield Town during the 2004–05 season as a striker and later played non-league football for Vauxhall Motors. He is a cousin of D.C. United manager and former England football star Wayne Rooney.

Career
Tommy, who is the cousin of Wayne, John and Graeme Rooney,  began his career at Tranmere Rovers, where he played in the youth and reserve sides but did not break into the first-team.

He joined League Two club Macclesfield Town in May 2004 on a one-year contract and made two league and cup appearances for the club in the 2004–05 season. He was one of several players released by Macclesfield in May 2005 following their defeat in the League Two play-offs.

He then joined Welsh Premier League champions Total Network Solutions on non-contract terms in July 2007. After training with TNS during the summer, he dropped into non-league football, joining Conference North club Vauxhall Motors at the beginning of the 2005–06 season and later joining Leigh RMI and Cammell Laird. He rejoined Vauxhall Motors in July 2008.

References

1984 births
Living people
Footballers from Liverpool
English footballers
Association football forwards
Tranmere Rovers F.C. players
Macclesfield Town F.C. players
The New Saints F.C. players
Vauxhall Motors F.C. players
Leigh Genesis F.C. players
Cammell Laird 1907 F.C. players
English Football League players
Rooney family (England)